Howard Eliot Wolpe (November 3, 1939 – October 25, 2011) was an American politician who served as a seven-term U.S. Representative from Michigan and Presidential Special Envoy to the African Great Lakes Region in the Clinton Administration, where he led the United States delegation to the Arusha and Lusaka peace talks, which aimed to end civil wars in Burundi and the Democratic Republic of the Congo. He returned to the State Department as Special Advisor to the Secretary for Africa's Great Lakes Region. Previously, he served as Director of the Africa Program at the Woodrow Wilson International Center for Scholars, and of the Center's Project on Leadership and Building State Capacity. While at the Center, Wolpe directed post-conflict leadership training programs in Burundi, the Democratic Republic of the Congo and Liberia.

A specialist in African politics for ten of his fourteen years in the Congress, Wolpe chaired the Subcommittee on Africa of the House Foreign Affairs Committee. As chair of the House Africa Subcommittee, Wolpe co-authored (with Rep. Ron Dellums and others) and managed legislation that imposed sanctions against South Africa, by over-riding President Ronald Reagan's veto of that sanctions legislation (the Comprehensive Anti-apartheid Act of 1986). He also authored and managed the passage of the African Famine Recovery and Development Act, -- a comprehensive rewrite in the 1980s of America's approach to development assistance in Africa that included the creation of the African Development Fund.

In 1992, Wolpe's Kalamazoo-based district was eliminated, and most of its territory, including his home, was merged with the district of three-term Republican Fred Upton. The reconfigured district was geographically more Upton's district than Wolpe's, prompting Wolpe to retire.

Prior to entering the Congress, Wolpe served in the Michigan House of Representatives and as a member of the Kalamazoo City Commission. In 1994, he won the Democratic nomination for Governor of Michigan.  He initially asked former First Lady of Michigan Helen Milliken to be his running mate, but Milliken declined his offer. Wolpe then selected one of his former rivals in the Democratic primary, State Senator Debbie Stabenow (now a US Senator), as his nominee for lieutenant governor. The Wolpe-Stabenow ticket lost the general election to incumbent Governor John Engler and Lieutenant Governor Connie Binsfeld.

Wolpe taught at Western Michigan University (Political Science Department), Michigan State University where he co-published a volume on modernization in Nigeria, and the University of Michigan (Institute of Public Policy Studies), and served as a visiting fellow in the Foreign Policy Studies Program of the Brookings Institution, as a Woodrow Wilson Center Public Policy Scholar, and as a consultant to the World Bank and to the Foreign Service Institute of the U.S. State Department.

Wolpe received his B.A. degree from Reed College, and his Ph.D. from the Massachusetts Institute of Technology. He was a member of the boards of directors of the National Endowment for Democracy (NED), Africare, Pathfinders, International and of the Advisory Board of Coexistence International. He co-directed (with Ambassador David C. Miller, Jr.) the Ninetieth American Assembly on "Africa and U.S. National Interests" held in March 1997. He wrote extensively on Africa, American foreign policy, and the management of ethnic and racial conflict.

Howard Wolpe was married to Judy Wolpe until her death in 2006. He died on October 25, 2011 at his home in Saugatuck, Michigan. Memorial services were held in Kalamazoo, Michigan in December 2011 and in Washington, D.C. in January 2012.

See also
 List of Jewish members of the United States Congress

References

External links
Congressional biography
Wilson Center biography
Woodrow Wilson International Center for Scholars* Listen to a 73 min audio interview with Howard Wolpe by David Wiley on his career in the Congress concerning the House Africa Subcommittee, racism, and U.S. foreign policy, taped at Michigan State University in 2003''' 

|-

1939 births
2011 deaths
Democratic Party members of the United States House of Representatives from Michigan
Democratic Party members of the Michigan House of Representatives
People from Washington, D.C.
Politicians from Los Angeles
Reed College alumni
University High School (Los Angeles) alumni
Western Michigan University faculty
20th-century American politicians
People from Saugatuck, Michigan
Politicians from Lansing, Michigan